Muhammad ibn Abdallah ibn Malik al-Khuza'i was a ninth century governor of the Yemen for the Abbasid Caliphate.

He was appointed as governor during the caliphate of al-Amin (r. 809–813) in an attempt to placate the Yemenis, following complaints about the unpopular administration of his predecessor Hammad al-Barbari. After arriving in the Yemen, he acted against Hammad's agents in the various districts of the province by confiscating their wealth, thereby winning the approval of the local population. He remained governor until mid-811, when he was dismissed in favor of Muhammad ibn Sa'id al-Kinani.

Notes

References 
 
 
 
 

Abbasid governors of Yemen
9th-century Arabs
9th-century people from the Abbasid Caliphate
9th century in Yemen